Gudur is a village and also a mandal in Mahabubabad District of Telangana State, India. The Gudur mandal headquarters are situated in Gudur.

Geography 
Gudur is located at 17.7975° N, 79.9794° E, spread over an area of 2864 hectares. Gudur is situated between Narsampet and Mahabubabad towns of Mahabubabad District. It has an average elevation of 222 meters.

History 
Gudur has significant leaders who played a prominent roles in the Telangana movement and sacrificed their lives.

Demographics 
According to 2011 Census of India, Gudur has a population of 11174 and number of households are 2574. Female Population is 50.2%. Its literacy rate is 57.4% and the female literacy rate is 24.5%. It has significant amount of scheduled tribes population, called Lambadas with about 43.7%.

Mines 
Gudur mandal is rich in Iron ore which is spread over 2500 hectares. In 2010, the erstwhile AP Government has allocated 5,342 hectares of Iron ore mining to a joint venture of AP Minerals Development Corporation Ltd and Rakshana Consortium, a private company and was cancelled in 2013 by AP Govt headed by Kiran Kumar Reddy and he allocated them to the Rashtriya Ispat Nigam Ltd. (VSP). It led to a controversy and the Ministry of Mines cancelled all permits to mine Iron ore in this region. In 2014, Telangana State had emerged and TRS Party has formed the government with one of the slogans Bayyaram Ukku, Telangana Hakku.

Villages 
There are 25 villages  in Gudur Mandal. They are the following:

References

Villages in Mahabubabad district